Simeon Simeonov may refer to
Simeon Simeonov (footballer, born 1946) (1946–2000), Bulgarian football goalkeeper
Simeon Simeonov (footballer, born 1983), Bulgarian football midfielder